Gordon Albert Miller (born 16 December 1939 in Croydon, Greater London, England) is a former British high jumper.

Athletics career
Miller first competed internationally at the 1958 British Empire and Commonwealth Games in Cardiff, Wales. One month later at the 1958 European Athletics Championships in Stockholm, Sweden, Miller, representing Great Britain in the high jump, only managed to clear  and was not enough to make the final. In final, Miller didn't improve on his qualifying height and finished in 16th position. This placed him in 18th position.

References

1939 births
Living people
English male high jumpers
Olympic athletes of Great Britain
Commonwealth Games competitors for England
Athletes (track and field) at the 1960 Summer Olympics
Athletes (track and field) at the 1964 Summer Olympics
Athletes (track and field) at the 1958 British Empire and Commonwealth Games
Athletes (track and field) at the 1962 British Empire and Commonwealth Games